Otradnoye or Vidradne is an urban-type settlement in the Yalta municipality of the Autonomous Republic of Crimea, a territory recognized by a majority of countries as part of Ukraine and annexed by Russia as the Republic of Crimea.

Its population was 582 at the 2001 Ukrainian census. Current population:

References

Urban-type settlements in Crimea
Seaside resorts in Russia
Seaside resorts in Ukraine
Yalta Municipality